Giacomo Ferri (born 20 January 1959) is an Italian football manager and former player, who played as a defender.

He is the brother of Riccardo, who was also a former player.

He is nicknamed Big Jim.

Club career
He began his playing career for Frassati in Lombardy, before he transferred to Crema in IV Serie. At age 16, he debuted for the first team where he made 8 appearances. He then transferred to Torino, where he passed through the youth ranks and the Primavera.

In 1978, he moved to Reggio Calabria where with Reggina he disputed three seasons in Serie C1. He returned to Torino in 1981 where he remained until relegation in 1989, when he moved to Lecce.

He accumulated 264 appearances and scored 4 goals in Serie A.

Managerial career
He started coaching the youth teams of Reggina before becoming assistant coach of the first team in the 1994–95 season that gained promotion to Serie B.

His career as a coach is largely tied to Torino: as youth coach to first-team coach, the latter task covered in the closing months of the 2002–03 season. In 2005, he left Torino arriving at Casale, where his tenure ended with a dismissal.

In 2010, he returned to Torino with the task of team manager. On 5 July 2016 he was succeeded by Luca Castellazzi.

References

External links
Dario Marchetti (eds.), GiacomoFerri in Enciclopediadelcalcio.it, 2011.
Statistics on Wlecce.it

1959 births
Living people
Association football defenders
Italian football managers
Italian footballers
Serie A players
Serie B players
Serie C players
Reggina 1914 players
Torino F.C. players
U.S. Lecce players
Torino F.C. managers